Night and Day is a 1978 play by Tom Stoppard. The sets and costumes were designed by Carl Toms and it ran for two years at the Phoenix Theatre in central London, UK. The lead roles of Richard Wagner and Ruth Carson were created by John Thaw and Diana Rigg, respectively.

Overview
The play is post-colonial in nature, a satire on the British news media, and an exploration of its discourse. Stoppard employs yet another sub-text in Night and Day by commenting on the very form of language through his remarks on journalism (Stoppard is a former journalist himself). There is a consistent use of pun and innuendo sprinkled in the dialogues of each character. This kind of linguistic play with words and meaning has marked the playwright for his interest and most keen observations on the aesthetics of language.

Night and Day throws up themes of colonization, journalism, language, and alternate or multiple realities. The plot narrative unfolds through the silent or subconscious thoughts of Ruth Carson, who is a bystander to the main events taking place around her. She is regularly shown to express conflicting ideas between what she is saying, and what she is actually thinking.

The narrative technique merges the forms of fiction and non-fiction, where Stoppard has created an imaginary country called Kambawi, located in Africa, and situated in a post-colonial time-space. The story of the play unveils the politics under which the British media approach the coverage of the impending internal war in this country, through the paradigms of objectivity, factual reportage and the inevitable realities of linguistic manipulation and double meaning.

Reception
Night and Day won the Evening Standard Award for Best Play. In a positive review, Michael Billington wrote:

References

External links
 Review in Variety (2004)

Plays by Tom Stoppard
1978 plays
Works about colonialism
Works about journalism